Henry Schultze (1893 – 1959) was an American academic and former president of Calvin College in Grand Rapids, Michigan. Having been born in Sully, Iowa, Schultze graduated from Calvin College in 1915. He also attended Calvin Theological Seminary and went on to study at Yale University and graduated in 1920. After his graduation, he taught Greek and education at Grundy College and in 1924 was ordained as a minister in the Christian Reformed Church. In 1926 he was appointed a professor at Calvin Theological Seminary. Schultze served ten years as president of the National Union of Christian Schools, beginning in 1930. Because of his skill as a teacher and his long-standing support for Christian education, Schultze was appointed Calvin College president in 1940.

During Schultze's tenure, the enrollment at Calvin College sank as a result of World War II but rebounded quickly when the war was over. In 1949 Schultze oversaw the restructuring of the academic governance process and in 1950 he took part in the dedication of a new one million dollar science building on the Franklin campus. After resigning the college presidency due to ill health in 1951, he was appointed Professor Extraordinary at Calvin Theological Seminary. Today, the dormitory Schultze Hall at Calvin College is named in his honor.

Schultze married Jeannette Ophof in 1920 and they had three children.

1893 births
1959 deaths
Calvin University alumni
American people of Dutch descent
Presidents of Calvin University
20th-century American academics